is a drifting driver from Japan who competes in the D1 Grand Prix series and racetrack and land owner. Nicknamed Kuma, he is commonly referred to as one of the pioneers of drifting.

Born to a wealthy family who owned a large portion of land in the Fukushima countryside, with the easy accessibility of the family plot, Kumakubo was able to use some of it to build and develop the Ebisu Circuit.

Kumakubo also used the circuit to host numerous drifting events as well as various motorsport events.
whilst stumbling through the numerous rallying magazines in his office and considering that the Subaru Impreza was the car to have as many rear wheel drive cars were considered not suitable for drifting or in need of development to be considered suitable, also in a way to bring Impreza owners to his track, Kumakubo commissioned tuning company JUN Auto to build an Impreza WRX STI Impreza, significantly with a radiator on the rear passenger side.

The car debuted at the Odaiba round, unlike others who switched to newer models, his performance would pay off when he was runner up at the Silverstone exhibition round and for the  season, he had beaten Ken Nomura by just 1 point. Midway through the  D1 series Kumakubo switched from the Impreza to an Evo 9 (built also by JUN Auto) during round 5 at Ebisu.

He has also built a Mitsubishi Lancer Evolution X in the Team Orange livery which was shown at the Tokyo Auto Salon.

He also runs the Big X the invitation only outdoor show that combines drifting, FMX, supermoto, car stunts and other extreme sports featuring the experts from each field.

Big X's drifting squad is called DriftXtreme, which the well known drivers of the D1GP are invited to join including team mate Kazuhiro Tanaka and Naoto Suenaga.

Kumakubo is currently competing in the European Drift Championship  in his Subaru Impreza WRX STI. His Team Orange teammate Kazuhiro Tanaka is also competing.

Complete Drifting Results

D1 Grand Prix

References

External links
Yuke's D1 Project Blog (Nobushige Kumakubo)
D1 Supporter profile

Japanese racing drivers
Drifting drivers
1970 births
Living people
D1 Grand Prix drivers